Nyay Anyay  is a 1990 Indian Hindi-language action film, produced by Sudhakar Bokade on Divya Films Combines banner and directed by Lawrence D'Souza. Starring Jeetendra, Jaya Prada, Sumeet Saigal, Shilpa Shirodkar and music composed by Anand–Milind. This was the first movie of Lawrence D'Souza and Sudhakar Bokade as director and producer. The duo had later collaborated in making of movies Saajan and Sapne Sajan Ke.

Plot
Ravi Khanna has worked hard to be where he is now - a Judge in Bombay High Court. He had fallen in love with beautiful Lawyer Rama and had married her. His brother, Sumit, is a college student, who has always excelled in sports and studies. Sumit is in love with Anju, the only daughter of Diwan Pratap Singh, an alliance that is suitable both for the Khanna's and the Diwan, and preparations are on for their marriage. Then one day Anju goes missing. A lengthy search leads to the discovery of her battered and bruised body. Diwan and Sumit are devastated by her death. Anju's death is followed by the brutal death of five more college students. Police Inspector Khan's investigation leads him to conclude that Sumit Khanna has committed these murders, and he arrests Sumit. But Sumit is quite nonchalant about his arrest, as he knows that the matter is to be tried in his brother's court and that the lawyer defending him is none other than his sister-in-law Rama.

Cast

Jeetendra as Judge Ravi Khanna 
Jaya Prada as Advocate Rama Khanna 
Sumeet Saigal as Sumeet Khanna 
Shilpa Shirodkar as Anju Singh 
Anupam Kher as Diwan Pratap Singh 
Paresh Rawal as Malhotra 
Mangal Dhillon as Inspector Khan
Shashi Kiran

Soundtrack

External links
 

1990 films
1990s Hindi-language films
Films scored by Anand–Milind
Films directed by Lawrence D'Souza